Michele Van Gorp (born May 10, 1977) is a former professional basketball player in the  Women's National Basketball Association (WNBA), most recently with the Minnesota Lynx.

Early career 
After attending Chippewa Valley High School in Clinton Township, Michigan, Van Gorp played collegiate basketball at Purdue University during her freshman and sophomore years, but transferred to Duke University alongside Nicole Erickson for her junior and senior years. She was the tallest woman to suit up in a Duke uniform. She led Duke to the school's first NCAA final, which took place in San Jose, and in which the Blue Devils were beaten 62-45 by Purdue.  She was inducted to the Duke Athletics Hall of Fame in 2002.

Purdue and Duke statistics
Source

USA Basketball
Van Gorp competed with USA Basketball as a member of the 1997 Jones Cup Team that won the silver medal in Taipei. Several of the games were close, with the USA team winning four games by six points or fewer, including an overtime game in the semifinal match against Japan. The gold medal game against South Korea was also close, but the USA fell 76–71 to claim the silver medal for the event. Van Gorp was the leading scorer in the game against Thailand, with 19 points and averaged 6.3 points per game over the course of the tournament.

WNBA career 
The first Duke student athlete to be selected in the WNBA's draft in 1999, she was selected in the second round, being the 18th overall pick. Van Gorp was traded to Portland after her rookie season, where she improved her personal averages and gained confidence in her game. After only one year with the Portland Fire she was traded to the Minnesota Lynx alongside Lynn Pride. With the Lynx, Van Gorp gained recognition as one of the league's toughest defenders and an effective weapon to help "shut down" Margo Dydek.

She missed most of the 2004 season due to a stress fracture in her left foot that occurred during a practice session.  Surgeons had to insert a screw into the navicular bone of her foot.  Van Gorp's contract with the Lynx had expired after the 2004 WNBA season ended, but she was still too injured to play for the 2005 season.

Van Gorp was one of the first WNBA athletes to disclose to the media that she was in a same-sex relationship during her playing career.

WNBA career statistics

Regular season

|-
| align="left" | 1999
| align="left" | New York
| 21 || 0 || 5.6 || .333 || .000 || .800 || 0.8 || 0.3 || 0.0 || 0.1 || 0.1 || 1.0
|-
| align="left" | 2000
| align="left" | Portland
| 28 || 1 || 7.1 || .500 || .000 || .543 || 1.5 || 0.2 || 0.1 || 0.1 || 1.1 || 2.5
|-
| align="left" | 2001
| align="left" | Minnesota
| 22 || 8 || 11.0 || .375 || .000 || .550 || 1.5 || 0.5 || 0.1 || 0.3 || 0.8 || 1.9
|-
| align="left" | 2002
| align="left" | Minnesota
| 22 || 13 || 16.0 || .456 || .286 || .727 || 2.9 || 0.6 || 0.3 || 0.5 || 0.9 || 4.5
|-
| align="left" | 2003
| align="left" | Minnesota
| 31 || 1 || 17.0 || .432 || .000 || .673 || 3.5 || 0.5 || 0.3 || 0.6 || 1.8 || 5.6
|-
| align="left" | 2004
| align="left" | Minnesota
| 8 || 0 || 8.3 || .474 || .000 || .500 || 1.6 || 0.1 || 0.0 || 0.1 || 0.9 || 2.8
|-
| align="left" | Career
| align="left" | 6 years, 2 teams
| 132 || 23 || 11.4 || .436 || .200 || .627 || 2.1 || 0.4 || 0.2 || 0.3 || 1.0 || 3.2

Playoffs

|-
| align="left" | 2003
| align="left" | Minnesota
| 3 || 0 || 10.3 || .286 || .000 || .625 || 0.3 || 1.0 || 0.3 || 1.0 || 1.3 || 3.0
|-
| align="left" | Career
| align="left" | 1 year, 1 team
| 3 || 0 || 10.3 || .286 || .000 || .625 || 0.3 || 1.0 || 0.3 || 1.0 || 1.3 || 3.0

International career
Van Gorp also played in Europe for the following teams: 
 Panathinaikos (1999) 
 Parma (2000)
 CJM Bourges (2000) - Euroleague winner
 Dynamo Moscow (2003)
 Ros Casares Valencia (2004)
 Nantes-Reze (2008)

After WNBA
According to a December 1, 2005, news article from the Minneapolis Star-Tribune, Van Gorp filed a medical malpractice lawsuit in Hennepin County District Court against a member of the Lynx's medical staff and three other parties.  The suit named Dr. Joel Boyd, the team's orthopedic surgeon; Dr. Fernando Pena; Fairview-University Medical Center; and Orthopaedic Center as defendants. Van Gorp was reported to be seeking at least $50,000 for negligence and loss of employment.  

After leaving the WNBA, Van Gorp was reported to be the assistant coach of Glens Falls, New York high school girls basketball team.   In June 2007, Colgate University in upstate New York announced that Van Gorp had been appointed as an assistant coach of its women's basketball team..

Van Gorp currently works in recruiting with the Duke Women's Basketball program in Durham, NC, and is also taking business school coursework.

References

External links
WNBA.com: Michele Van Gorp Player Info
LYNX: Michele Van Gorp: A Key Component
December 1, 2005 Minneapolis Star-Tribune report on Van Gorp's lawsuit

1977 births
Living people
All-American college women's basketball players
American expatriate basketball people in France
American expatriate basketball people in Greece
American expatriate basketball people in Italy
American expatriate basketball people in Russia
American expatriate basketball people in Spain
American women's basketball coaches
American women's basketball players
Basketball players from Michigan
Centers (basketball)
Duke Blue Devils women's basketball players
LGBT basketball players
LGBT people from Michigan
Lesbian sportswomen
Minnesota Lynx players
New York Liberty draft picks
New York Liberty players
Panathinaikos WBC players
Parade High School All-Americans (girls' basketball)
People from Mount Clemens, Michigan
Portland Fire players
Purdue Boilermakers women's basketball players
Sportspeople from Metro Detroit